The Shadow of Chikara (also known as Demon Mountain, The Ballad of Virgil Cane, Thunder Mountain, Wishbone Cutter, and The Curse of Demon Mountain) is a 1977 American Western horror film written and directed by Earl E. Smith. The film stars Joe Don Baker, Sondra Locke, Ted Neeley, Dennis Fimple, John Davis Chandler, Linda Dano and Slim Pickens. It was released on July 15, 1977, by Howco International Pictures. The film features the song The Night They Drove Old Dixie Down by The Band.

Plot

Confederate veterans of the last battle of the American Civil War team up with a geologist and set out to find a hidden treasure: diamonds hidden in a cave in an Arkansas mountain. However, the soldiers find they are being followed by a mysterious hunter (or hunters) who may have a connection to a mythic eagle spirit, Chikara.

Cast 
Joe Don Baker as Wishbone Cutter
Sondra Locke as Drusilla Wilcox
Ted Neeley as Amos Richmond
Dennis Fimple as Posey
John Davis Chandler as Rafe
Linda Dano as Rosalie Cutter
Slim Pickens as Virgil Cane

Release

Home media
The film was released on DVD by Mill Creek Entertainment on July 5, 2005. It was later released by Dead Of Night on February 20, 2006. It was re-released by Mill Creek on September 12, that same year. In 2015, it was released by Movies Unlimited and Willette Acquisition Corp. on July 10, and 20th respectively.

References

External links 
 
 

1977 films
1977 horror films
1970s Western (genre) horror films
American supernatural horror films
American Western (genre) horror films
Paramount Pictures films
1970s supernatural horror films
American Civil War films
Treasure hunt films
1970s English-language films
1970s American films